Servando Bayo (October 27, 1822 – May 18, 1884) was an Argentine politician who served as the National Autonomist Party governor of the province of Santa Fe from April 7, 1874, to April 7, 1878.

A native of Rosario, Bayo attended a military training institution and took part in the Battle of Cepeda with the rank of captain. As a politician, he was Rosario's Political Chief (comparable to a non-elected mayor), a senator, and governor of the province (with Juan Manuel Zavalla as his vice-governor).

Bayo is regarded as a dynamic ruler who supported progressive measures. During his governorship, he sponsored the creation of the Santa Fe Provincial Bank, with the goal of increasing access to credit for the business and productive sector, while breaking the financial monopoly of the Bank of London, which the governor also deprived of the authorization to emit currency. The Bank of London retaliated against the newly created Provincial Bank by inducing bank runs in order to weaken it. In response, governor Bayo ordered the liquidation of the Rosario branch of the Bank of London as harmful to the interests of the province, and arrested its manager. Following orders of the British consul in Buenos Aires, a British ship was dispatched from Montevideo up the Paraná River to threaten the use of force against this harm to the kingdom's commercial interests. The conflict was solved in September 1876, after six months, with the mediation of the Argentine chancellor Bernardo de Irigoyen. In the ultimate outcome, the Bank of London accepted the conditions imposed by Santa Fe's government.
 

Governor Bayo also created the office of the General Inspector of Schools, which was the basis for today's provincial Ministry of Education, and passed a law that made elementary education compulsory for all children.

Bayo served in the Argentine Senate from 1881 until his death in 1884, replacing  as senator for Santa Fe.

A biography of Servando Bayo, Santa Fe. Una Época. Un Gobernador. Servando Bayo, was published in 2006 by Jorge Campana. 

1822 births
1884 deaths
Mayors of Rosario, Santa Fe
Governors of Santa Fe Province
People from Rosario, Santa Fe
Members of the Argentine Senate for Santa Fe